Heterocrine glands (also known as mixed glands) are the glands which function as both exocrine gland and endocrine gland. These include the pancreas and the gonads (testes and ovaries).

References 

Glands
Exocrine system
Endocrine system
Pancreas
Human anatomy